Pradeep Kumar Singh (born 29 December 1964) is an Indian politician and a member of the Indian Parliament since 2009. He won the seat again in 2019 Indian general election. He also served as member of the legislative assembly in 2005. 

He is also a Member of Standing Committee on Chemicals and Fertilisers, Member of Consultative committee, Ministry of Petroleum & Natural Gas.

References

1964 births
Living people
Lok Sabha members from Bihar
Bharatiya Janata Party politicians from Bihar
People from Araria district